Patricia Urquiola Hidalgo (born 1961 in Oviedo) is a Spanish architect, industrial designer and art director.

Biography 
At age 22, Urquiola left her hometown of Oviedo to attend the Polytechnic University of Milan in architecture. After graduation, she went to work at the studio of De Padova in Milan where she became the head of product design. From 1996 to 2001 she worked for Lissoni Associati. She has designed products and furniture for companies including Alessi, Cappellini, Cassina, Coalesse, Kartell, and Moroso. Her Step Sofa was shown at the Salone del Mobile in Milan. Since 2015, she has been the Creative Director of the Italian furniture company Cassina. Urquiola has also started designing clothing with her first fashion collection for Max Mara in 2022. Also in 2022, Urquiola helped renovate and redesign the Haworth Hotel in Holland, Michigan.

Reception 
In 2011 she was awarded the Medalla de Oro al Mérito en las Bellas Artes and the Order of Isabella the Catholic by King Juan Carlos I of Spain.

The New York Times has described her as: "possibly the most lauded and in-demand industrial designer in Europe, on par with Philippe Starck and Hella Jongerius".

Museum Collections & Exhibitions 
Her work has been acquired for the permanent collections of the Museum of Modern Art in New York, Philadelphia Museum of Art, Vitra Design Museum, and Musée des Arts décoratifs in Paris. Her work has also been displayed in the following exhibitions:
 2013 “O’clock – time design, design time”, CAFA Art Museum, Beijing, China.
 2013 "Patricia Urquiola and Rosenthal, Landscape", Neues Museum, Nüremburg, Germany. 
 2017 "Patricia Urquiola: Between Craft and Industry", Philadelphia Museum of Art, Philadelphia, USA.

References

External links 

patriciaurquiola.com Official site

Glasstress Patricia Urquiola at the Venice Biennale

1961 births
Living people
Polytechnic University of Milan alumni
20th-century Spanish women
20th-century Spanish architects
21st-century Spanish architects
Spanish women architects
Spanish designers
Industrial designers
Product designers
Furniture designers
Designers
Compasso d'Oro Award recipients